Amrit was an ancient Phoenician city located near Tartus in Syria.

Amrit may also refer to:
 Amrit, Egypt, a village in Abou Hammaad, Sharqia Governorate
 Amrit (film), a 1986 Indian Hindi film
 Amrit (album), a 1992 album by Nusrat Hussain
 Amrita, name for objects, ceremonies, people, etc. stemming from ancient India
 Amrit Sanskar, the Sikh ceremony of initiation or baptism
 Amrita, the elixer of life in Indian religions

People with the given name 
 Amrit Abhijat
 Amrit Bhattarai
 Amrit Bhushan Dev Adhikari
 Amrit Desai
 Amrit Gangar
 Amrit Kaur
 Amrit Keshav Nayak
 Amrit Kumar Bohara
 Amrit Lal (1940s Southern Punjab cricketer)
 Amrit Lal (1960s Southern Punjab cricketer)
 Amrit Lugun
 Amrit Maan
 Amrit Maghera
 Amrit Mahal
 Amrit Mangat
 Amrit Manthan
 Amrit Nahata
 Amrit Pal (athlete)
 Amrit Pal (actor)
 Amrit Patel
 Amrit Pritam
 Amrit Rai
 Amrit Sagar
 Amrit Sanchar
 Amrit Singh (disambiguation)
 Amrit Singh (cyclist)
 Amrit Tewari
 Amrit Velā
 Amrit Wilson

See also  
 
 Amrita (disambiguation)